The Ministry of Health and the Fight against AIDS ) is the health ministry of the Côte d'Ivoire. , the Minister for Health was Dr. Raymonde Goudou Coffie.

See also 
 Health in Ivory Coast

External links 
 http://www.sante.gouv.ci/

Ivory Coast
Healthcare in Ivory Coast
Health